Navarre railway line is an abandoned railway between Navarre  in the Wimmera region of the Australian state of Victoria and Ben Nevis railway station. The town of Navarre is located in the Shire of Northern Grampians and was surveyed in 1855 and renamed after the medieval European Kingdom of Navarre.

Officially opened on May 26, 1914, the line had five stations: Navarre, Tulkara, Landsborough, Joel, Crowlands, and the terminus, Ben Nevis railway station where the line connected with the Avoca railway line. Rolling stock, engines, such as the Victorian Railways Dd class locomotive (including locomotive K174), drivers and repair crews were supplied from Ararat and the service began by running services three days per week.

History 
In 1911 a Victorian Parliamentary committee made the following recommendation.

"The Committee recommends the construction of a 5ft. 3in. railway from Crowland to Navarre, 21 miles 59 chains in length, as permanently surveyed, and terminating about 2¼ miles south-west of Navarre township, at an estimated cost of £74,735 with £1,485 added for rolling stock, as it considers that the line should be built with serviceable second-hand rails, and that the construction should not be entered upon until such rails are available."

The line was to connect with the Ararat - Avoca - Maryborough line with a junction installed at Ben Nevis and there was debate amongst the members of the Committee as to the exact location of the station at Navarre. At this early stage they could already see the possibility of it being extended to the north to Marnoo and St Arnaud.

The line ran through lightly undulating, partly wooded countryside for 36 kilometres. Gold had been found in the region during the 1850s and many of those pioneers who had arrived there at that time remained to establish their own farms and businesses. Planning for the line began some years before its actual construction and changes in its routing were to be inevitable. Originally the line was expected to service the expanding agricultural needs of the region, carrying livestock, wheat and chaff. Although the railway also operated a passenger service, one of the biggest users of the line were timber cutters and for a while six mills operated in the area supplying firewood to connecting stations including Ararat, Ballarat and further to the south-east the capital city of Victoria, Melbourne

From its opening in 1914, returns from the operation of the line were adequate to justify its existence. Within a short period of time, extra storage sheds were required at nearly all the stations to handle local produce on its way to market. However, by the late 1940s, with dwindling supplies of suitable timber, the advent of motorised transport and rising operating costs, it appeared more and more likely that the line would close if something couldn't be done quickly. To try to improve the situation, leading businessmen of the area, particularly from St Arnaud, Victoria, to the north, lobbied to have the line extended to pick up an increasing trade in grain.

Closure of the line 
Well before 1950 the department of the Victorian Railways was already considering the future of the line. At a meeting of local businessmen, in Landsborough, it was revealed that there had been a sharp move away from the use of firewood, which represented 90% of the lines trade, to coal. This therefore left the Railways with little option but to close the line in the near future. Demand continued to fall while running costs increased and the single goods service was reduced further from once a week to once a fortnight. by 1953. In an advertisement in The Argus newspaper of February 14, 1954, the closure of the line was announced with the last service to run on February 25 that year.

By 2010 little remained of the railway although aerial photographs clearly show sections of the right of way (ROW) to the west and north-west of Landsborough, today located in the Pyrenees Shire. Those track lines not left to nature were originally replaced with gravel roads, some of which were later asphalted such as the Tulkara - Navarre Road. Stations, such as Tulkara and Crowlands remain as little more than mounds of earth by the roadside with the scattered remnants of track sleepers, and mounds of ballast, the only clue as to what may have been there. The terminus at Ben Nevis, just 100 meters or so off the Pyrenees Highway, exists only as a couple of weather beaten railway crossing signs on a dirt road which crosses the Ararat to Avoca rail line. At Navarre, ground works suggesting a railway servicing area, loading ramp and weighbridge pit bear testament to the grand ideals local businessmen had for the area.

See also
 Avoca railway line
 List of closed railway stations in Victoria

References

External links 
Avoca station at VicRailStations.com

Railway lines in Victoria (Australia)
Railway lines opened in 1914
Railway lines closed in 1954